Mahajanga II is a district of Boeny in Madagascar.

Communes
The district is further divided into nine communes:

 Ambalabe Befanjava
 Ambalakida
 Andranoboka
 Bekobay
 Belobaka
 Betsako
 Boanamary
 Mahajamba Usine
 Mariarano

References 

Districts of Boeny